Than Phu Ying Dhasanawalaya Sornsongkram, née Dhasanawalaya Ratanakul Serireongrit (born 11 November 1945 in Switzerland), is the only daughter of Galyani Vadhana, Princess of Naradhiwas and niece of King Bhumibol Adulyadej and elder cousin of King Vajiralongkorn (Rama X).

Early life
Dhasanawalaya Ratanakul Serireongrit was born on November 11, 1945 in Switzerland. She is the only daughter of Galyani Vadhana, Princess of Naradhiwas and Colonel Aram Ratanakul Serireongrit, son of General Charun Rattanakun Seriroengrit.

At the age of 6, she returned to Thailand with her uncle, King Bhumibol and her aunt-in Law, Queen Sirikit, by ship. After arriving in Thailand, she continued her education at Mater Dei School, Triam Udom Suksa School and Faculty of Arts, Chulalongkorn University. After graduation, she continued her studies in Switzerland.

Marriage
During her time studying in Switzerland, she met Sinthu Sornsongkram, who was a civil servant at the Royal Thai Embassy in Bern. They married on 12 November 1973. They have a son, Army Captain Jitat Sornsongkram.

Career and later life
Thanpuying Dhasanawalaya  Sorasongkram has been a lecturer in the Faculty of Economics, Chulalongkorn University.

She received her rank as Thanpuying on 5 May 1986. She was considered to be the closest grandchild of Srinagarindra, the Princess Mother.

Honours
  Dame Grand Commander (Second Class, Upper Grade) of The Most Illustrious Order of Chula Chom Klao
  Dame Grand Cordon (Special Class) of The Most Exalted Order of the White Elephant
  Dame Grand Cordon (Special Class) of The Most Noble Order of the Crown of Thailand
  Dame Grand Cross (First Class) of The Most Admirable Order of the Direkgunabhorn
  King Rama IX Royal Cypher Medal (First Class)
  Commemorative Medal on the Occasion of the Coronation of H.M. King Rama X
  King Rama X Royal Cypher Medal (First Class)

Ancestry

References 

1945 births
Dhasanawalaya Sornsongkram
Dhasanawalaya Sornsongkram
Living people
Dhasanawalaya Sornsongkram
Dhasanawalaya Sornsongkram